Major-General  Geoffrey Grahame Rawson  (2 December 1887 – 14 January 1979) was a British Army officer who served in both the First and Second World Wars and had a notable cricket career, playing first-class cricket for the Army in 1921.

Military career
He was born as the son of an Indian Civil Servant and went to England where he was educated at Cheltenham College. Upon his graduation from the Royal Military Academy, Woolwich, in 1908, Rawson was commissioned into the Royal Engineers as a second lieutenant.  He was promoted lieutenant on 18 August 1910. By 20 November 1915, over fifteen months after the outbreak of the First World War, he had been promoted to captain, and he was then given command of a signals company at a corps headquarters, with a temporary majority, he was awarded the Military Cross (MC) in the 1916 King's Birthday Honours.  His temporary rank became a brevet on 3 June 1917.  He was appointed assistant director, army signals (with the acting rank of lieutenant-colonel) on 19 April 1917, relinquishing the post (and the rank) on 13 November 1917.  He was then appointed a Staff Captain at the War Office on 6 April 1918.  He formally transferred from the Engineers to the newly established Royal Corps of Signals on 22 March 1921, and since taking up the post of Staff Captain, had been appointed an Officer of the Order of the British Empire.

On 1 April 1921 he was promoted from Staff Captain to Deputy Assistant Adjutant General, still at the War Office, holding the post until 29 January 1923.  By 1928 he was substantive lieutenant-colonel and commanded a signals regiment for four years until 15 May 1932, when he was promoted to colonel and placed on the half pay list. On 5 December 1932 he was appointed chief instructor at the School of Signals,  holding the post until 5 December 1936.  On 30 June 1937 he was appointed deputy director of the signals department at the War Office, and was granted the temporary rank of brigadier; he became director, with the acting rank of major-general, on 3 January 1941. He held the additional honorary appointment of Aide-de-camp to George VI between 1 August 1938 and April 1941, vacating the appointment when his acting rank of major-general was made substantive.  The promotion was back-dated to 14 January 1941, with seniority from 14 June 1938.  He was appointed Companion of the Order of the Bath (CB) in the 1941 King's Birthday Honours.  He retired on 2 December 1944, and was appointed Colonel Commandant of the Royal Corps of Signals on 31 December 1944, holding the role until 18 September 1950.

Cricket career
A right-handed batsman, Rawson played three first-class matches during the 1921 English cricket season, all for the Army. He first played against Cambridge University and Oxford University, before playing against the Royal Navy at Lord's.

He later played three matches for the Egypt national cricket team. Two against Free Foresters in 1927, and one against HM Martineau's XI in 1935.

References

Bibliography

External links
Generals of World War II

1887 births
1979 deaths
Egyptian cricketers
English cricketers
British Army cricketers
British Army generals of World War II
British Army personnel of World War I
Royal Engineers officers
Royal Corps of Signals officers
Companions of the Order of the Bath
Officers of the Order of the British Empire
Recipients of the Military Cross
Graduates of the Royal Military Academy, Woolwich
War Office personnel in World War II
Military personnel of British India
People educated at Cheltenham College
British people in colonial India